Discopus antennatus is a species of beetle in the family Cerambycidae. It was described by Félix Édouard Guérin-Méneville in 1855.

References

Acanthoderini
Beetles described in 1855